Leon Knopoff (July 1, 1925 – January 20, 2011) was a geophysicist and musicologist. He received his education at Caltech, graduating in 1949 with a PhD in physics, and came to UCLA the following year. He served on the UCLA faculty for 60 years.  His research interests spanned a wide variety of fields and included the physics and statistics of earthquakes, earthquake prediction, the interior structure of the Earth, plate tectonics, pattern recognition, non-linear earthquake dynamics and several other areas of solid Earth geophysics.  He also made contributions to the fields of musical perception and archaeology.

Honors and awards
 Fellow of the American Geophysical Union, 1962.
 Elected to the National Academy of Sciences, 1963.
 Fellow of the American Association for the Advancement of Science, 1964.
 Fellow of the American Academy of Arts and Sciences, 1965.
 Fellow of the Guggenheim Foundation, 1976.
 Recipient of the Gold Medal of the Royal Astronomical Society, 1979. 
 Medal of the Seismological Society of America, 1990.
 Member of the American Philosophical Society, 1992.

References

1925 births
2011 deaths
American geophysicists
American seismologists
Recipients of the Gold Medal of the Royal Astronomical Society
Members of the United States National Academy of Sciences
Foreign Fellows of the Royal Astronomical Society
Fellows of the Royal Astronomical Society
University of California, Los Angeles faculty
Fellows of the American Geophysical Union
Members of the American Philosophical Society